The Keep is a role-playing video game developed and published by Cinemax.

Gameplay
The game is a dungeon crawler consisting of 10 levels, each a floor of Watrys's Tower. To complete a level a player must get through multiple puzzles, traps and enemies. The game features realtime combat and players can use magic spells. A spell can be cast with the help of runes that players find across levels. Different mixtures of runes make different spells.

Story
The evil wizard Watrys is becoming more powerful and the ruling council of the land ignores the threat he poses. Eventually, Watrys burns down the village of Tallia and abducts all of the children to mine magic crystals for him. A nameless hero then sets off to a tower where Watrys lives in hopes of defeating him and saving the children. Along the way, it is explained that the crystals are the source of magic in the realm, but that they also have toxic and addictive properties. Eventually, the hero slays Watrys, and it is revealed he is the son of the miner who originally discovered the crystals.

Reception
The game has received generally positive reviews from critics. The average review score is 77% 

NintendoDojo gave the game 83%. It praised the gameplay, most notably the combat system. The challenging difficulty and puzzles also got a positive response. On the other hand, it criticised the lack of an automatic save feature and level design as every room looked the same.

RPG Fan marked the game as a miniature clone of Legend of Grimrock but rated it positively at 70%.

Sequel
The developer announced during GDS 2014 that the sequel The Keep 2 was in pre-production development. More details were set to be revealed in 2015.

References

External links
Official Site
The game on games.cinemax.cz

2014 video games
Arc System Works games
Dungeon crawler video games
Fantasy video games
Indie video games
Nintendo 3DS games
Role-playing video games
Single-player video games
Video games developed in the Czech Republic
Windows games